(The Carnival in Rome) —also known as — is an operetta in three acts composed by Johann Strauss II to a libretto by Josef Braun, Richard Genée and Maximilian Steiner. It was Strauss' second operetta and based on Victorien Sardou's 1861 comedy Piccolino. The work premiered on 1 March 1873 at the Theater an der Wien.

Roles

References
Notes

Sources
 
 Traubner, Richard (2003) Operetta: A Theatrical History, Routledge. 

Operas by Johann Strauss II
German-language operettas
1874 operas
Operas
Operas based on plays
Operas based on works by Victorien Sardou